Gymbowen is a township in the Shire of West Wimmera of Victoria, Australia.

History 
The date and establishment of the Gymbowen township is unknown, however the local school was opened in 1891 and the local hotel possibly earlier. The Post office was opened in 1882 and the 1891-92 post office directory lists the following residents:

Gymbowen served as a coach changing stage and as the railway reached there by 1894 until it closed in 1986. The Gymbowen hotel was a widely patronized place of refreshment, and it is said that many stories should have been preserved for posterity.

Gymbowen was the second post office in the district and the oldest survivor having opened on 1 June 1882 under the management of Mr. J. Houston. The annual postal allowance was 6 pounds (A$13.9). William H. Knight conducted the office in conjunction with the general store for many years; Leo Knight was appointed assistant on 11 December 1922 and postmaster on 1 December 1938.

The post office was transferred to Arthur Henry on 21 November 1946 and following his death on 13 December 1965, to Mrs. Margaret Fish.

School 
The Gymbowen School first on the 27th of March 1881. The school started with 8 boys and 10 girls. The school closed on August 31, 1951, with the students transferred to Goroke Consolidated School or as it now known Goroke P-12 College
These are some of the teachers that taught at this school: Young, Clancy, Carter, Clarke, Glenning, Beardsley, Hogan, Canty, Meehan, Trelfel, E Sharpe, J Hedigan, Brown, M Davies, K Makie, M Dudt, Lanrigan, L Wurfell, N Belcher, M Murphy, N tink, J Scott, Betts, Bryant, K Jellett, Messer, J Houston, J Clark, R greening, Claringbold, R Williams, Skidmore, L Pascoe, P Bright, L Prime, J Gleesner, J Lynch, W Passmore, F Duffy, J Roberts, M Dankett, Elmore and Jefferies.

Sports
In 1940 Gymbowen, Goroke and Minimay combined to enter Tatiara League. During World War II social matches were played between Edenhope, Goroke, Apsley, and Minimay with proceeds to patriotic funds.

References

Back To Goroke
Centenary of Education 1885-1985 Goroke & District

Towns in Victoria (Australia)